Mensah is a Ghanaian surname. It is the most common surname in Ghana, with one in 55 people having this name. There is a Mensah in every tribe in Ghana. Notable people with the surname include:

 Akwasi Mensah (born 1986), American footballer
 Akwety Mensah (born 1983), Ghanaian footballer
 Amewu Mensah (born 1977), German high jumper
 Andrews Pomeyie Mensah (born 1983), Ghanaian footballer
 Anne Mensah, British broadcasting executive
 Anthony Mensah (born 1972), Ghanaian footballer
 Cédric Mensah (born 1989), Togolese footballer
 Charles Mensah (1948–2009), Gabonese filmmaker
Charles Mensah (disambiguation), multiple people
 Collins Mensah (born 1961), Ghanaian sprinter
 E. T. Mensah (1919–1996), Ghanaian musician
 Enoch Teye Mensah (born 1956), Ghanaian politician
 Evans Mensah (born 1988), Ghanaian footballer
 Evans Mensah (born 1998), Ghanaian footballer 
 Francis Mensah (born 1988), Ghanaian footballer
 Gideon Mensah (born 1998), Ghanaian footballer
Ivan Anokye Mensah, (born 2004), Ghanaian footballer
 Jeff Mensah, Danish footballer
 John Mensah (born 1982), Ghanaian footballer
 Jonathan Mensah (born 1990), Ghanaian footballer
 Joseph Henry Mensah (born 1928), Ghanaian politician
 Kevin Mensah (born 1991), Ghanaian-Danish footballer
 King Mensah (born 1971), Togolese musician
 Kofi Mensah (born 1978), Dutch-Ghanaian footballer
Kofi Mensah (born 1996), Ghanaian footballer
 Kofi Nahaje Sarkodie-Mensah, known as Kofi Kingston (born 1981), Ghanaian-American professional wrestler
 Kojo Mensah (born 1985), Ghanaian basketball player
 Michael Mensah (born 1981), Ghanaian footballer
 Mohammed Martin Mensah (born 1981), Ghanaian footballer
 Nana Appiah Mensah (born 1986), Ghanaian Businessman and Magnate
 Nathan Mensah (born 1998), Ghanaian basketball player
 Omenaa Mensah (born 1979), Ghanaian-Polish television presenter
 Peter Mensah (born 1959), Ghanaian-Canadian actor
 Pops Mensah-Bonsu (born 1983), British basketball executive and former player
 Philomena Mensah (born 1975), Ghanaian-Canadian sprinter
Raphael Assibey-Mensah (born 1999), German footballer
 Victor Mensah (born 1985), Ghanaian footballer
 Vincent Mensah (1924–2010), Beninese Roman Catholic bishop
 William Mensah (born 1982), Ghanaian footballer
 Samson Mensah (born 1972),
Ghanaian-British Scientist Electronics

References

Surnames of Ashanti origin
Surnames of Akan origin